The Shallows is an album by the band I Like Trains, released on 7 May 2012.

It is a concept album based on the book The Shallows by Nicholas Carr. It was produced by Richard Formby.

Track listing
"Beacons"	
"Mnemosyne"	
"The Shallows"	
"Water/Sand"	
"The Hive"	
"The Turning Of The Bones"	
"Reykjavik"
"We Used To Talk"
"In Tongues"

References

2012 albums
Albums produced by Richard Formby
I Like Trains albums